Trnovo (or ) is a village in the municipality of Bitola, North Macedonia. The village is 7.53 kilometers away from Bitola, which is the second largest city in the country.

History 
Aromanians settled in Trnovo in addition to Orthodox Albanian refugees who arrived mainly from Vithkuq, fleeing the 18th century socio-political and economic crises in what is now southern Albania. Due to intermarriage, the Orthodox Albanian population of Trnovo was assimilated by the larger Aromanian community at the onset of the twentieth century. A small number of Muslim Albanians over time settled in Trnovo originating from the Korçë region. In 1864, in Trnovo, the first Aromanian school in Macedonia opened its doors for its children. The school was financed by Romania and was supervised by Apostol Mărgărit. It was founded by Dimitri Atanasescu, who was the teacher of the school and a native of the village.

During the first World War, Trnovo was occupied by the Bulgarian military who evacuated most of the Aromanian villagers and sent them into the interior of Bulgaria and Serbia. The relocation of local Aromanians was due to Bulgarian forces being concerned that pro-Greek and pro-Serbian sympathies existed among them resulting in possible cooperation with the Entente Allies. While in exile, some villagers had to fend for themselves whereas others for the Bulgarians did forced labour. Some Aromanians returning to Trnovo and neighbouring Magarevo saw the level of destruction caused by war in the villages and around 30 families from both settlements crossed the Mariovo mountains on foot into Greece for Aridaia. The Aromanians hoped that their plight and previous service during the Macedonian Struggle for the Greek cause would be recognised by Greece toward eventually re-establishing themselves in Aridaia.

Demographics
In statistics gathered by Vasil Kanchov in 1900, the village of Trnovo was inhabited by 2400 Aromanians and 50 Muslim Albanians.

According to the 2002 census, the village had a total of 278 inhabitants. Ethnic groups in the village include:

Macedonians 146
Albanians 82
Vlachs (Aromanians) 48
Serbs 1 
Others 1

Notable people
 Dimitri Atanasescu

References

External links

Villages in Bitola Municipality
Aromanian settlements in North Macedonia
Albanian communities in North Macedonia